Volodymyr Hanchenko (born 7 February 1971) is a Soviet boxer. He competed in the men's light flyweight event at the 1992 Summer Olympics.

References

1971 births
Living people
Soviet male boxers
Olympic boxers of the Unified Team
Boxers at the 1992 Summer Olympics
Place of birth missing (living people)
Light-flyweight boxers